Hippocrepis is a genus of flowering plants in the family Fabaceae.

Etymology 

The name "Hippocrepis" comes from the Greek for "horse" and for "shoe": literally, "horseshoe"; this is descriptive of the shape of the fruit segments in some species
.

Species 

Notable species include (along with their common names):

 Hippocrepis emerus, or scorpion senna.
 Hippocrepis comosa, or horseshoe vetch.

References

 
Fabaceae genera